Diffusion maps is a dimensionality reduction or feature extraction algorithm introduced by Coifman and Lafon  which computes a family of embeddings of a data set into Euclidean space (often low-dimensional) whose coordinates can be computed from the eigenvectors and eigenvalues of a diffusion operator on the data. The Euclidean distance between points in the embedded space is equal to the "diffusion distance" between probability distributions centered at those points. Different from linear dimensionality reduction methods such as principal component analysis (PCA), diffusion maps are part of the family of nonlinear dimensionality reduction methods which focus on discovering the underlying manifold that the data has been sampled from. By integrating local similarities at different scales, diffusion maps give a global description of the data-set. Compared with other methods, the diffusion map algorithm is robust to noise perturbation and computationally inexpensive.

Definition of diffusion maps
Following  and, diffusion maps can be defined in four steps.

Connectivity
Diffusion maps exploit the relationship between heat diffusion and random walk Markov chain. The basic observation is that if we take a random walk on the data, walking to a nearby data-point is more likely than walking to another that is far away.

Usually, this probability is specified in terms of a kernel function of the two points: . For example, the popular Gaussian kernel:

 

More generally, the kernel function has the following properties

   
( is symmetric)

 
( is positivity preserving).

The kernel constitutes the prior definition of the local geometry of the data-set. Since a given kernel will capture a specific feature of the data set, its choice should be guided by the application that one has in mind. This is a major difference with methods such as principal component analysis, where correlations between all data points are taken into account at once.

 

and define:

 

Although the new normalized kernel does not inherit the symmetric property, it does inherit the positivity-preserving property and gains a conservation property:

Diffusion process

We define the diffusion matrix  (it is also a version of graph Laplacian matrix)

 

We then define the new kernel

 
or equivalently,

 
where D is a diagonal matrix and 

We apply the graph Laplacian normalization to this new kernel:

 
where  is a diagonal matrix and 

 

Specifically, the notion of a cluster in the data set is quantified as a region in which the probability of escaping this region is low (within a certain time t). Therefore, t not only serves as a time parameter, but it also has the dual role of scale parameter.

The eigendecomposition of the matrix  yields

 

Due to the spectrum decay of the eigenvalues, only a few terms are necessary to achieve a given relative accuracy in this sum.

Parameter α and the diffusion operator
The reason to introduce the normalization step involving  is to tune the influence of the data point density on the infinitesimal transition of the diffusion. In some applications, the sampling of the data is generally not related to the geometry of the manifold we are interested in describing. In this case, we can set  and the diffusion operator approximates the Laplace–Beltrami operator. We then recover the Riemannian geometry of the data set regardless of the distribution of the points. To describe the long-term behavior of the point distribution of a system of stochastic differential equations, we can use  and the resulting Markov chain approximates the Fokker–Planck diffusion. With , it reduces to the classical graph Laplacian normalization.

Diffusion distance
The diffusion distance at time  between two points can be measured as the similarity of two points in the observation space with the connectivity between them. It is given by

 

Explicitly:

 
There are several interesting features associated with the diffusion distance, based on our previous discussion that  also serves as a scale parameter:
 Points are closer at a given scale (as specified by ) if they are highly connected in the graph, therefore emphasizing the concept of a cluster.
 This distance is robust to noise, since the distance between two points depends on all possible paths of length  between the points.

Diffusion process and low-dimensional embedding
The diffusion distance can be calculated using the eigenvectors by
 

So the eigenvectors can be used as a new set of coordinates for the data. The diffusion map is defined as:

 

Because of the spectrum decay, it is sufficient to use only the first k eigenvectors and eigenvalues.
Thus we get the diffusion map from the original data to a k-dimensional space which is embedded in the original space.

In  it is proved that

 
so the Euclidean distance in the diffusion coordinates approximates the diffusion distance.

Algorithm
The basic algorithm framework of diffusion map is as:

Step 1. Given the similarity matrix L.

Step 2. Normalize the matrix according to parameter : .

Step 3. Form the normalized matrix .

Step 4.

Step 5. Use diffusion map to get the embedding .

Application
In the paper  Nadler et al. showed how to design a kernel that reproduces the diffusion induced by a Fokker–Planck equation. They also explained that, when the data approximate a manifold, one can recover the geometry of this manifold by computing an approximation of the Laplace–Beltrami operator. This computation is completely insensitive
to the distribution of the points and therefore provides a separation of the statistics and the geometry of the
data. Since diffusion maps give a global description of the data-set, they can measure the distances between pairs of sample points in the manifold in which the data is embedded. Applications based on diffusion maps include face recognition, spectral clustering, low dimensional representation of images, image segmentation, 3D model segmentation, speaker verification and identification, sampling on manifolds, anomaly detection, image inpainting, revealing brain resting state networks organization   and so on.

Furthermore, the diffusion maps framework has been productively extended to complex networks, revealing a functional organisation of networks which differs from the purely topological or structural one.

See also
Nonlinear dimensionality reduction
Spectral clustering

References

Machine learning algorithms